Eagle Games, now known as Eagle-Gryphon games, is a  board game publisher.

Background
Eagle Games was founded in 2001 by Glenn Drover, and was bought by Ashland, Oregon-based FRED Distribution, Inc. doing business as Gryphon Games in 2007. From 2007 to 2014 they published games under the two lines as Gryphon Games and Eagle Games.

They are currently based in Leitchfield, Kentucky and are now known as Eagle-Gryphon Games. Eagle-Gryphon Games is known for a large catalog of games that range from fast, fun family games to larger strategy games with longer game time.

Board games

Notable titles
Age of Steam
Baseball Highlights 2045
Brass
Cheeky Monkey
Conquest of the Empire
Defenders of the Realm
Fantastiqa
Fleet
For Sale
Francis Drake
I'm the Boss
Incan Gold
Lisboa
Master's Gallery
On Mars
Pastiche
Rococo
Roll Through the Ages: Bronze Age
Roll Through the Ages: Iron Age
Take It Easy
The Gallerist
The Pick A Pig/Pick A Dog/Pick A Polar Bear series
The Railways of the World series
Through the Ages
Triassic Terror
Vinhos Deluxe Edition

References

External links 

Game manufacturers